Events in the year 2022 in the Republic of the Congo.

Incumbents 

 President: Denis Sassou Nguesso
 Prime Minister: Anatole Collinet Makosso
 Cabinet: Anatole Collinet Makosso's government

Events 
Ongoing — COVID-19 pandemic in the Republic of the Congo

 31 July – 2022 Republic of the Congo parliamentary election: The second round of the parliamenentary election takes place.

Culture

See also 

African Continental Free Trade Area
COVID-19 pandemic in Africa

Deaths 

 10 January – Martin Parfait Aimé Coussoud-Mavoungou, politician (born 1959)
 23 July – Henri Elendé, Olympic high jumper (born 1941)

References 

 
2020s in the Republic of the Congo
Years of the 21st century in the Republic of the Congo
Republic of the Congo
Republic of the Congo